The Bundesamt für Strahlenschutz (BfS) is the German Federal Office for Radiation Protection. The BfS was established in November 1989; the headquarters is located in Salzgitter, with branch offices in Berlin, Bonn, Freiburg, Gorleben, Oberschleißheim and Rendsburg. It has 708 employees (including 305 scientific) and an annual budget of around 305 million Euro (2009). Since 2009 the BfS is also responsible for the storage site of radioactive waste, Schacht Asse II.

History 
Against the background of the Chernobyl nuclear disaster in April 1986 and the so-called transnuclear scandal in 1987, the BfS was founded with the aim of re-bundling competencies and responsibilities in the field of radiation protection. The following organizational units were merged into the BfS:

 Department "Securing and Disposal of Radioactive Waste" (SE), Physikalisch-Technische Bundesanstalt, Braunschweig
 Institute for Atmospheric Radioactivity (IAR), Federal Office for Civil Protection, Freiburg
 Institute for Radiation Hygiene (ISH), Federal Health Office, Neuherberg near Munich
 Parts of the Society for Reactor Safety (GRS) mbH, Cologne/Munich

With reunification, parts of the State Office for Nuclear Safety and Radiation Protection of the former GDR were added after a short time.

In 1990, the BfS took over the operational management of the repository for radioactive waste from the former GDR in Morsleben. In the years that followed, it expanded the local dose rate (ODL) measurement network for monitoring environmental radioactivity.

Between 2001 and 2003, the BfS issued the first permits for the construction of decentralized interim storage facilities for spent nuclear fuel at the sites of German nuclear power plants. In 2009, the operation and immediate decommissioning of the Asse mine was transferred to the BfS. After comparing options, it was decided to salvage the waste from the mine.

The new start in the search for a repository for high-level radioactive waste also resulted in a restructuring of the authorities involved in 2016. Tasks in the area of ​​disposal, storage and transport of radioactive waste and nuclear safety, for which the BfS was responsible, were assigned to transferred to the Federal Office for the Safety of Nuclear Waste Management (BASE), on the other hand to the Federal Society for Disposal (BGE). Among other things, BASE has also taken over the task of keeping statistics on reportable events from the BfS. With the reorganization, the competencies of the BfS are concentrated on the state tasks of radiation protection, for example in the area of ​​nuclear emergency protection, medical research, mobile communications, UV protection or the measuring networks for radioactivity in the environment.

Structure
The BfS is supervised by the Federal Ministry for Environment, Nature Conservation and Nuclear Safety (BMU). 
The BfS has four sub-departments.

 Fachbereich SK – Sicherheit in der Kerntechnik – Department for Safety in Nuclear Engineering
 Fachbereich SE – Sicherheit nuklearer Entsorgung – Department for the Safety of Nuclear Waste Disposal
 Fachbereich SG – Strahlenschutz und Gesundheit –  Department for Radiation and Health
 Fachbereich SW – Strahlenschutz und Umwelt – Department for Radiation and the Environment

Gamma dose rate network 
 
The BfS operates a gamma dose rate measurement network with about 1800 probes, uniformly distributed over Germany. The automatically working systems compare the actual level of radiation with the long term mean and sends an alert to the data centers immediately, if the radiation exceeds the threshold value. This network is a part of the German early warning system, in case of a nuclear accident. Hardware of data logger and probes as well as software are developed in-house by the BfS. On the mountain Schauinsland the BfS operates an international measurement station for gamma dose rate probe calibration and long term tests.

Another important task of the BfS is research in the areas of radiation protection and radiation protection precautions. The BfS provides technical and scientific support to the Federal Ministry for the Environment, Nature Conservation and Nuclear Safety (BMU) in the areas mentioned.

See also

Comprehensive Nuclear-Test-Ban Treaty
Schacht Asse II
Schacht Konrad
Repository for radioactive waste Morsleben
Nuclear safety

References

External links

 Data from the German gamma dose rate network with about 1800 probes (German only)
BfS – Gamma dose rate network data logger (full working demo installation)

Environment of Germany
Nuclear organizations
Salzgitter
1989 establishments in Germany
Organizations established in 1989
Organisations based in Lower Saxony
Radiation protection organizations